Ulurapa is the name of a mountain in Cacavei village, Lospalos, Lautem, Timor Leste.

Mountains of East Timor